Juraj Kukura (born 15 March 1947, in Prešov) is a Slovak actor.

Kukura studied acting at the Academy of Performing Arts in Bratislava (VŠMU). In 1985, when he emigrated to West Germany, his films were banned in the Czechoslovak Socialist Republic until Communist rule ended during the Velvet Revolution of 1989. Thanks to his charismatic personality he usually portrayed strong, leading characters. In 2004, he received DOSKY Award for performing Martin in The Goat, or Who is Sylvia? by Edward Albee. In 2003 he became managing director of Arena Theatre.

Filmography

Film 

Zbehovia a pútnici (1968) - Dominika - hrebenár
Eden and After (1970) - Boris
Zlozor (1971) - Slávo
N. a pris les dés... (1971)
Letokruhy (1973)
Javor a Juliana (1973) - Musician
Den slnovratu (1974) - Pavol Jurek
Trofej neznámeho strelca (1974) - Salo
Do zbrane kuruci! (1974) - Hamzík
One Silver Piece (1976) - Pitonák
Koncert pre pozostalých (1977) - Peter Korta
Krutá lúbost (1978)
Shadows of a Hot Summer (1978) - Ondrej Baran
The Ninth Heart (1979) - Aldobrandini
The Divine Emma (1979) - Victor
Postaveni mimo hru (1979) - Jindrich Vacula
The Hit (1981) - Lensky
Clny proti prudu (1981)
Sarâb (1982) - Statkár
Tusenie (1983) - Fero Usiak
Salt & Gold (1983) - král Norbert
The Roaring Fifties (1983) - Jakob Fuhrmann
Sojky v hlave (1984) - Vojto
Otto – Der Liebesfilm (1992) - Dr. Beierle
It's Better to Be Wealthy and Healthy Than Poor and Ill (1992) - Robert
Jak chutná smrt (1995) - Karel Kainar
Workaholic (1996) - Cedrik
Tábor padlych zien (1997) - Doctor Zigmund
Thomas and the Falcon King (2000) - Balador
Fragmenty z malomesta (2000)
Apokalypse 99 - Anatomie eines Amokläufers (2000)
Das Sams (2001) - Oberkellner
Atina & Herakles (2006) - August
The Last Train (2006) - Dr. Friedlich
Máj (2008) - Schiffner
Hotel Lux (2011) - Wassili Ulrich
Sarajevo (2014) - Stojan Jeftanovic

Television 
Via Mala (1985) - Andreas von Richenau
Traffik (1989) - Karl Rosshalde
Inspektor Max (2018) - Zoltán Max

References

External links

1947 births
Living people
Slovak actors
People from Prešov
Recipients of Medal of Merit (Czech Republic)